Carlos Cruz-Diez (17 August 1923 – 27 July 2019) was a Venezuelan artist said by some scholars to have been "one of the greatest artistic innovators of the 20th century."

Career 

In 2020, the Pérez Art Museum Miami acquired Chromosaturation (Cromosaturación), a site specific installation initially conceived in 1965, and presented in venues all over the globe, such as the Museum of Fine Arts, Houston (2011), United States; Galeries Nationales du Grand Palais in Paris (2013); and Museo Würth La Rioja, Spain (2017).

Exhibitions 
 Physichromies de Cruz-Diez: Oeuvres de 1954 à 1965, Galerie Kerchache, Paris, France, 1965.
 Cordoba Has III Bienal Interamericana de Arte, Cordoba, Argentina,  October 1966.
 Physichromies, Couleur Additive, Induction Chromatique, Chromointerferences, Galerie Denise René, 1971, New York, NY.
 Venezuelan Art Show presented by the Consulate General of Venezuela, Galeria Venezuela, New York, NY, October 1980.
 Geometric Abstraction: Latin American Art from the Patricica Phelps de Cisneros Collection, Fogg Art Museum, Harvard University, Cambridge, MA, August–November 2001.
 Geométriques et cinétiques, Gabinete de Arte Raquel Arnaud, São Paulo, Brésil Cruz-Diez, Galerie d'art de Créteil, France. Cruz-Diez, Galerie Lavigne Bastille, Paris, 2002.
 Couleur événement, Galerie Lavignes Bastille, Paris, 2004.
 Carlos Cruz-Diez: (In)formed by Color, Americas Society, New York, NY, 2008.
 Cruz-Diez, 50 ans de recherche, Galerie Lavigne Bastille, Paris, from November 2009 to March 2010.
 Carlos Cruz-Diez: El color en el espacio y en el tiempo, MALBA, Buenos Aires 2011.
 Circumstance and Ambiguity of Color, at Maxwell Davidson Gallery, New York, NY, from 2 May to 28 June 2013.
 Carlos Cruz-Diez in Black & White, Americas Society, New York, NY, 2014.
 Carlos Cruz-Diez: Evolving Color, Louis Stern Fine Arts, West Hollywood, CA, from 17 May until 26 July 2014.
 Transfiguration de la couleur, at Marlborough Gallery, Monaco, from 19 March until 26 May 2015.
 Chromatic Transfiguration, at Maxwell Davidson Gallery, New York, NY, from 28 May to 3 July 2015.
 Light Show, Museum of Contemporary Art, Sydney, Australia, from May to 5 July 2015.
 Didaktik und dialektik der farbe, Kleine Museum, Weißenstadt, Germany, from 7 July to 17 October 2015.
 Carlos Cruz-Diez: Mastering Colour, at Puerta Roja, Hong Kong, from 18 March to 25 May 2017.
 Carlos Cruz-Diez: Luminous Reality, at Phillips Gallery, London, UK, from 16 July to 6 September 2018.
 Carlos Cruz-Diez: Chromosaturation (Cromosaturación), at Pérez Art Museum Miami, United States, from June 10, 2022 to September 25, 2023.

Selected works
 , 1954–65
 , 1960
 , 1969
 Chromosaturation (Cromosaturación) at the Pérez Art Museum Miami, 1965 (conceived)

Awards 
 1966 Grand award, III Bienal Americana de Arte, National University of Córdoba, Exact science department, Córdoba, Argentina.
 1967 International painting Award, IX Bienal de São Paulo, São Paulo, Brasil.
 1969 Second prize, International painting festival, Château-Musée de Cagnes-sur-Mer, Cagnes-sur-Mer, France.
 1971 National Prize of Plastic Arts of Venezuela, National Institute of Arts and Culture (INCIBA), Caracas, Venezuela.
 1976 Art integration award, VI Architecture Biennale, Architecture school of Venezuela, Caracas, Venezuela.
 1981 Order of Andrés Bello, First class, Caracas, Venezuela.
 2002 Commandeur de l'Ordre des Arts et des Lettres, París, France.
 2006 Doctor Honoris Causa, Casa Rectoral, Simón Bolívar University, Caracas, Venezuela.
 2007 Doctor Honoris Causa in Art, University of the Andes, Mérida, Venezuela.
 2008 Honorary Medal of the city of Marcigny, Marcigny, France.
 2010 AICA 2009 Award, International Association of Art Critics, Caracas, Venezuela.
 2011 Gold Medal of the Americas Society, Cipriani Wall Street, New York City. 31st Annual Spring Party, organized by Americas Society.
 2011 Best living artist award, Estampa 2011 fair, Madrid, Spain.
 2012 Ordre National de la Légion d'Honneur, Officier, París, France.
 2012 Paez Medal of Art, New York City.  (VAEA).
 2012 Premio Penagos, Fundación Mapfre, Madrid, Spain.
 2015 Turner Medal for Colour, Physical Society of London, London, United Kingdom.

References

Other sources

 Bann, Stephen. Four Essays on Kinetic Art. St. Albans: Motion Books 1966.
 Brett, Guy. Kinetic Art. New York: Reinhold Book Corporation 1968.
 Frank Popper Origins and Development of Kinetic Art, Studio Vista and New York Graphic Society, 1968
 Chacon, Katherine. Carlos Cruz-Diez: Cultural Center of the Fundacion Corp Group Art Nexus no. 44 April/June 2002
 Glueck, Grace. ART REVIEW: A Universe of Art, Centered in Boston. New York Times August 17, 2001.
 Latin American Research Review Vol. 3, No. 1 (Autumn, 1967), pp. 189–90
 On Campus: The University of Texas at Austin September 13, 1999 Constructive Horizons: The Latin American Perspective.
 Yunes, Gladis. Luisa Richter: Museo de la Estampa y del Diseno Carlos Cruz-Diez. Art Nexus no. 43 Ja/Mr 2002

Further reading 
 
 Atwood, Roger, Making Color 3D, ARTnews, New York, vol. 111, No. 10, November 2010. 
 
 
 Chanson, Marion (2011-03-24) L'Atelier de Carlos Cruz-Diez (The Studio of Carlos Cruz-Diez), bilingual English and French, Thalia Edition,

External links

Official Webpage

1923 births
2019 deaths
People from Caracas
Venezuelan sculptors
Venezuelan painters
Venezuelan expatriates in France
Op art
Academic staff of the Central University of Venezuela
Venezuelan contemporary artists